is a train station in the town of Kawanehon, Haibara District, Shizuoka Prefecture, Japan, operated by the Ōigawa Railway.  From Abt Ichishiro Station to Nagashima Dam Station the gradient is very steep and an Abt rack system is used.

Lines

Station layout
The station has two opposed side platforms serving two tracks, connected to a small red-roofed station building by a level crossing. The station is unattended.

Adjacent stations

|-
!colspan=5|Ōigawa Railway

Station history
Abt Ichishiro Station was opened on August 1, 1959, and was originally named . The original line past this station and the stations on that line are now submerged under the waters of the reservoir created by the completion of the Nagashima Dam. When Nagashima Dam Station was built in 1990, the present Abt system was installed.

Passenger statistics
In fiscal 2017, the station was used by an average of 2 passengers daily (boarding passengers only).

Surrounding area
Ōi River
Ōigawa Dam

See also
 List of Railway Stations in Japan

References

External links

 Ōigawa Railway home page

Stations of Ōigawa Railway
Railway stations in Shizuoka Prefecture
Railway stations in Japan opened in 1959
Kawanehon, Shizuoka